The following lists events that happened in 1986 in Iceland.

Incumbents
President – Vigdís Finnbogadóttir 
Prime Minister – Steingrímur Hermannsson

Events

 May 3: Iceland makes its first participation in the Eurovision Song Contest with the song Gleðibankinn, sang by ICY band.
 11-12 October: Reykjavík Summit between U.S. President Ronald Reagan and General Secretary of the Communist Party of the Soviet Union Mikhail Gorbachev.

Births

19 June – Ragnar Sigurðsson, footballer
25 July – Margrét Lára Viðarsdóttir, footballer.
14 September – Hallbera Guðný Gísladóttir, footballer
24 November – Guðmundur Pétursson, footballer

Deaths

19 January – Jón Helgason, philologist and poet (b. 1899)

30 November – Emil Jónsson, politician (b. 1902).

27 December – Snorri Hjartarson, poet (b. 1906)

Full date missing
 Gunnlaugur Halldórsson, architect (b. 1909)

References

 
1980s in Iceland
Iceland
Iceland
Years of the 20th century in Iceland